Jowzar (also Romanized as Jowzār and Jūzār; also known as Nīzār) is a village in Kabgian Rural District, Kabgian District, Dana County, Kohgiluyeh and Boyer-Ahmad Province, Iran. At the 2006 census, its population was 325, in 64 families.

References 

Populated places in Dana County